Destanee Aiava and Olivia Gadecki were the defending champions but chose not to participate.

Anna Danilina and Anastasia Tikhonova won the title, defeating Lu Jiajing and You Xiaodi in the final, 6–4, 6–2.

Seeds

Draw

Draw

References

External Links
Main Draw

Open ITF Arcadis Brezo Osuna - Doubles